Christopher David Nash (born 19 May 1983) is a retired English cricketer who represented Sussex and Nottinghamshire County Cricket Club in an 18 year professional career.

He also played first-class cricket for Loughborough UCCE in 2003 and 2004 having made his first-class debut for Sussex in 2002, against Warwickshire at Edgbaston.

Nash was born in Cuckfield, Sussex. He started as an off-spin bowler, batting down the order for Sussex and Loughborough UCCE.  Later he specialised as a batsman, often opening for Sussex.

He was part of the Sussex team that won the County Championship in 2006 and 2007 while he played twice in the group stages in Sussex's successful Cheltenham & Gloucester Trophy campaign of 2006.

He scored his maiden first-class hundred on 7 August 2008 against Lancashire at Old Trafford.

At the end of the 2017 season, Nash left Sussex after asking to be released from the final year of his contract. He subsequently signed for newly promoted Nottinghamshire on a three-year contract.

He was released by Notts at the end of the 2020 season. Shortly after  he started a new job in private healthcare with DJW Health and agreed to play for Horsham in the Sussex League.

References

External links

1983 births
Living people
English cricketers
Auckland cricketers
Loughborough MCCU cricketers
Nottinghamshire cricketers
Otago cricketers
Sussex cricketers
Sussex Cricket Board cricketers
English cricket commentators
People from Cuckfield
People educated at The College of Richard Collyer
British Universities cricketers